The Spider is a 1931 American pre-Code mystery film directed by Kenneth MacKenna and William Cameron Menzies and starring Edmund Lowe, Lois Moran, El Brendel and John Arledge. It was released on September 27, 1931, by Fox Film Corporation. It was based on the 1927 play The Spider by Fulton Oursler and Lowell Brentano.

Synopsis
A celebrated magician Chatrand the Great announces at the end of a performance in a radio broadcast that he is searching for the real identity of his assistant, a victim of amnesia who apparently lost his memory after suffering a head wound two years earlier. Beverly Lane answers the appeal, as she believes the man in is her brother. A murder soon follows.

Cast        
Edmund Lowe as Chatrand
Lois Moran as Beverly Lane
El Brendel as Ole
John Arledge as Tommy
George E. Stone as Dr. Blackstone
Earle Foxe as John Carrington
Manya Roberti as Estelle
Howard Phillips as Alexander
Purnell Pratt as Inspector Riley
Jesse De Vorska as Goldberg
Kendall McComas as The Kid
Ruth Donnelly as Mrs. Wimbledon

References

External links 
 

1931 films
Fox Film films
American mystery films
1931 mystery films
Films directed by William Cameron Menzies
American black-and-white films
1930s English-language films
1930s American films
Films about magic and magicians